"Older Than You" is a song by Australian rock band Eskimo Joe, released in October 2004 as the third and final single from their second studio album, A Song Is a City (2004). The song peaked at number 46 on the Australian Singles Chart and was ranked at number 32 on Triple J's Hottest 100 of 2004. At the ARIA Music Awards of 2005, the song won the ARIA Award for Best Group while being nominated for ARIA Award for Engineer of the Year and ARIA Award for Producer of the Year with Paul McKercher.

Background
Kav Temperley said "This song was written in autumn last year when I'd just split up with my girlfriend of four years and had gone over to Melbourne to meet up with a girl who I guess was one of the catalysts for the break up. Nothing had happened, but that window was there. We met up and the thing that I really appreciated about her is that she was a couple of years younger than me but her eyes were like the eyes of an old soul. So it's the story of us meeting up over there, but I held back 'cause it didn't seem right to simply jump from one relationship to the next. I have to trust in existence. It's a continuing story."

Music video
The film clip for "Older Than You" was shot over 14 hours at Sydney's Hyde Park by director, Nash Edgerton, who had previously directed Eskimo Joe's "Liar" film clip.

Track listing

Charts

Release history

References

Eskimo Joe songs
2004 singles
2004 songs
ARIA Award-winning songs
Mushroom Records singles
Songs written by Stuart MacLeod (musician)
Songs written by Joel Quartermain
Songs written by Kavyen Temperley